Fangchenggang ( ''The port of Fangcheng'') is a prefecture-level city in the south of Guangxi Zhuang Autonomous Region, People's Republic of China. The city was formerly called "Fangcheng Pan-Ethnicities Autonomous County"  (25 December 1978 – 23 May 1993).

Fangcheng  is the southernmost port in China and is located in Fangchenggang. It primarily services bulk carriers, of up to 180,000 deadweight tonnes in size. The closest airport is located in Nanning, about 170 km away (4 hours drive). As of December 2018, the region had large amounts of land reclamation in progress to build new and additional ports.

History

Geography and Climate
Fangchenggang is a coastal city in southern Guangxi, bordering Vietnam.

Administration
Fangchenggang has 2 urban districts, 1 county, 1 county-level city, 19 townships, 13 towns, 283 villages, and 19 sub-districts.

Districts:
 Gangkou District
 Fangcheng District
County-level city:
 Dongxing
County:
 Shangsi County

Demographics
Fangchenggang has a total population of 717,966. Ethnic groups and their corresponding numbers are Han 390,286 or 54.36%, Zhuang 287,207 or 40% Yao 26,749 or 3.73%, Jing 12,288 or 1.71% and all other minorities combined 1,436 or 0.02%. Population density is 116 people per km2 and population growth is 7.75% annually.

Fangchenggang is a linguistically diverse city. The local languages include Qin-Lian Yue(a branch of Yue or Cantonese), Hakka, Zhuang, Yao, Vietnamese, of which the most dominant language is Yue.

Economy
Fanchenggang, the last part of which "gang" means port is as its name implies an important port for Guangxi, and other than Beihai the only major Chinese port on the Tonkin Gulf.

Besides port related industries there is substantial tourism, commercial fishing, hydropower, food and beverage production, and agriculture. Agricultural products include rice, corn, peanuts, oranges, and sugarcane. Other natural resources are coal, limestone, and spring water. The first phase of Fangchenggang Nuclear Power Plant, a nuclear power plant project is under construction here.

Fangchenggang is served by a railway branch from Qinzhou East through a half an hour train journey and to Nanning, a one and a half hour train ride. Since the end of 2013, the city's Fangchenggang North Railway Station has high-speed (D-series) train service from Nanning. As of March 2019, there were two trains daily (T type) to Qinzhou and 9 trains (D type) daily to Nanning railway station.

Flora and fauna
Like much of Guangxi, there are many forested mountains and stream filled valleys. The area along the border with Vietnam is relatively undeveloped and draws considerable tourism. Fangchenggang's forests contain more than 500 types of plants, more than 4000 medicinal plants and herbs, 25 species of mammals, and many species  of insects, reptiles, amphibians, and birds. Many nationally protected animals can still be found in Fangchenggang such as gibbons, frogs, butterflies, and tortoises. In the ocean waters, whales, dolphins, and dugongs can be seen.

The city flower of Fangchenggang Camellia nitidissima (金花茶, lit. 'gloden flower tea', Mandarin: Jīnhuāchá, Fangcheng Yue: [kɐm˦˥ fa˦˥ tɕʰa˧˩], Fangcheng Hakka: [kim˦˥ fa˦˥ tɕʰa˩˧] ), which is and a kind of quite rare Camellia plant only attribute in the area near the border between Vietnam and Guangxi. The flowers of Camellia nitidissima are made as bagged dried flowers for making tea and sell as a local specialty.

Culture

Tea-picking opera 
Mandarin Chinese: 採茶戲; pinyin: Cǎichá Xì; Fangcheng Yue dialect: 採茶 [tɕʰɔj˩˧.tɕʰa˨˩], Fangcheng Hakka dialect:  採茶 [tɕʰɔj˨˩.tɕʰa˩˧]

Tea-picking opera is the most popular traditional Chinese opera in Fangchenggang, in some grant occasions, celebrations and events such as fuels, traditionally the organizers of those will hire a Tea-picking opera theatre company to perform. 

Opera theatre also perform on a provisional and simple stage held by themselves on the side of streets, those locations are often fixedly chosen.

Nowadays, tea-picking opera actors generally speak Fangcheng Yue dialect in performances, but not entirely, they always consciously or unconsciously make their pronunciation approach to Guangzhou Cantonese, the standard and authoritative dialect to Cantonese.

Cuisine

Notable people 
Chén Jìtáng (陳濟棠)

References

External links
Official Website (Chinese)

Cities in Guangxi
Prefecture-level divisions of Guangxi
Gulf of Tonkin